Saint-Georges-sur-Moulon is a commune in the Cher department in the Centre-Val de Loire region of France.

Geography

Population

Sights
 The chateau des Granges, dating from the nineteenth century.
 A menhir known as the "Pierre à la Femme".
 Traces of a Roman aqueduct.
 A watermill, the Moulin Neuf.

See also
Communes of the Cher department

References

Communes of Cher (department)